Ben Pearson (November 16, 1898 – March 2, 1971) was an archer, bowyer, and fletcher from Pine Bluff, Arkansas. He is most notable for starting the first company in the United States to mass-produce archery sets and equipment. In 1972, he was among the first inducted into the Archery Hall of Fame.

Legacy
Pine Bluff Bowhunters hosts a tournament each May in memory of Ben Pearson.  This tournament is the oldest and largest 3D tournament in the state of Arkansas.  It attracts shooters from several nearby states.  Mrs. Pearson attends each year.

History
Ben Pearson made his first bow based on articles for Boy Scouts by Dan Beard. In 1926 Pearson entered the state championships using his own equipment; finishing next to last. Learning from the experience, he made new equipment and in 1927 he became the Arkansas State Champion. Pearson continued in competitive archery, and by 1938 he placed seventh in the NAA National Tournament, just behind future employee Pat Chambers, and 24 places above Fred Bear.

Prior to 1938 Pearson marketed his arrows through a series of eleven pamphlets, resulting in the first full Ben Pearson Inc. catalog being listed as "No. 12". That first catalog also only listed arrows, with bows added in the 1939 catalog.

By the early 1950s Ben Pearson Inc. was best known for its relatively inexpensive archery sets. To make more people aware of the higher end custom bows and arrows Pearson was still crafting to special order; the 1958 Catalog introduced higher-end bows with names rather than just model numbers.

In 1963, Ben Pearson Inc. was selling 3,000 bows and 3–4,000 arrows per day. In 1967 the company was acquired by Leisure Group, which dropped the highest-end bows from production. In 1972, Leisure Group sold Ben Pearson Archery to the Brunswick Corporation. By the company's 50th anniversary (1988) it had 350 employees and $100 million in payroll. That year, the company presented Governor Bill Clinton with the six millionth bow, and 200 millionth arrow manufactured.

References

External links
 Official website
 Ben Pearson Catalog archive at ArcheryArchive.com
 Ben Pearson Arrows
 Ben Pearson Arrow Boxes
 Ben Pearson Broadheads
 Ben Pearson Logos

Sportspeople from Pine Bluff, Arkansas
1898 births
1971 deaths
American male archers
Bowyers
20th-century American businesspeople